Osiedle Tysiąclecia (Millennial District) is a district of Katowice and one of the largest districts in Poland. It is located in the northern part of Katowice, on the land once occupied by the villages of Bederowiec, Sośnina and east Klimzowiec. The construction of the district began in 1961 during the times of the People's Republic of Poland. The name was chosen as 1961 was a 1000th anniversary of the founding of Poland.

It has an area of 1.88 km2 and in 2007 had 23,501 inhabitants.

The district is bordered by the town of Chorzów on the west, on the east by ul. Bracka (Bracka street), on the south by the Rawa and Załęże district and on the north by Silesian Park (Park Śląski).
The district is formed by several dozens of high apartment buildings of up to several dozen meters each. The largest of those are the "Kukurydze" (the Corn on a Cob) of 82 metres height (24 floors), which makes them the second tallest apartment buildings in Poland.

References

Districts of Katowice
Planned communities in Poland